This is a list of the 6 members of the European Parliament for Luxembourg in the 2004 to 2009 session.

List

Party representation

Notes

Luxembourg 2004-2009
List
2004